The 2014 Old Dominion Monarchs football team represented Old Dominion University in the 2014 NCAA Division I FBS football season. They were led by sixth-year head coach Bobby Wilder and played their home games at Foreman Field at S. B. Ballard Stadium in Norfolk, Virginia. The 2014 season marked the inaugural season for the Monarchs as a member of the NCAA Division I Football Bowl Subdivision (FBS), joining Conference USA and competing in the East Division. Old Dominion finished the season 6–6 (4–4 in C-USA play) to finish in a three-way tie for third place in the East Division. Despite finishing 6-6, Old Dominion was not invited to a bowl game, as they were in the second of a two-year transition period to the FBS and was ineligible for postseason competition.

Personnel

Coaching staff

Schedule

Schedule Source:

Game summaries

Hampton

NC State

Eastern Michigan

Rice

Middle Tennessee

Marshall

UTEP

Western Kentucky

Vanderbilt

FIU

Louisiana Tech

Florida Atlantic

References

Old Dominion
Old Dominion Monarchs football seasons
Old Dominion Monarchs football